The squad listings were announced on 16 November 2016.

Group A

Cameroon
Head coach: Enow Ngachu

Egypt
Head coach: Mohamed Mostafa Abdelhameed

South Africa
Head coach: Desiree Ellis

Zimbabwe
Head coach: Shadreck Mlauzi

Group B

Ghana
Head coach: Yusif Basigi

Kenya
Head coach: David Ouma

Mali
Head coach: Oumar Guindo

Nigeria
Head coach: Florence Omagbemi

References

2016 Africa Women Cup of Nations
Women's Africa Cup of Nation's squads